Alvord is a town in Wise County, Texas, United States. The population was 1,351 in 2020.

Originally known as Nina, Alvord adopted its present name in 1882 in honor of the president of the Fort Worth and Denver Railway. There is no connection with the Arizona bandit Burt Alvord. A post office was established in 1882. By 1890, Alvord was a retail center for area farmers. In 1925, Alvord had 1,376 residents (42 more than in 2010), a high school, an elementary school, four churches, and a weekly newspaper. The Burlington Northern Railroad stopped there.

The population dropped during the Great Depression because of a decline in watermelon farms and cattle ranches. In 1940, the population totaled 821, with 35 businesses; in 1960, 720 people and 19 businesses; in 1990, 865 residents and 16 businesses. In 2000, the population was 1,007, with 62 businesses.

Geography

Alvord is located at  (33.356968, –97.696026).

Climate
The climate in this area is characterized by hot, humid summers and generally mild to cool winters.  According to the Köppen Climate Classification system, Alvord has a humid subtropical climate, abbreviated "Cfa" on climate maps.

Demographics

As of the 2020 United States census, there were 1,351 people, 359 households, and 254 families residing in the town.

Notable people

Texas Railroad Commissioner Ernest O. Thompson, who also served as a mayor of Amarillo and became an expert on petroleum issues, was born in Alvord in 1892.

References

External links
 Historic Materials from the Alvord Public Library hosted by the Portal to Texas History
 Official City of Alvord Website

Towns in Texas
Towns in Wise County, Texas
Dallas–Fort Worth metroplex